is a series of tactical role-playing games with installments on the PlayStation, PlayStation 2, and PlayStation Portable. The franchise has been developed by Career Soft, and is owned by Atlus and Sega. The series is set in a world that is being taken over by an ancient evil. It is a spiritual successor to Career Soft's earlier Langrisser series. Working Designs published Growlanser II and III in North America together in a package called Growlanser Generations. Growlanser V: Generations was published in North America by Atlus USA and Europe by Rising Star Games under the name Growlanser: Heritage of War. The PSP version of Growlanser IV: Wayfarer of Time was also published in North America by Alus. All titles feature character art by Satoshi Urushihara.

Games

Other merchandise

 Soundtrack CDs for the Growlanser series were released in Japan by King Records (I, II, and III), FrontierWorks (IV), Pony Canyon (V) and Sony Music (VI).
 As a companion to Growlanser IV, a collection of entirely vocal music from the game was released as Growlanser IV: Wayfarer of the Time Original Character Song Album.
 With Growlanser IV came an OVA to the series, featuring a situation from the game turned into an anime. Silverneil, the main character of the OVA, travels around in the city trying to figure out what is going on regarding a rebellion and is given the decision either to join it or go against it. The ending theme to the OVA is "Yakusoku" (Promise), Silverneil's Image Song, featured as track 10 on the Character Song Album.

References

External links
 Atlus official website 
 Atlus U.S.A. official website 

 
OVAs based on video games
Sega Games franchises
PlayStation (console) games
PlayStation 2 games
PlayStation Portable games
Tactical role-playing video games
Video game franchises
Video game franchises introduced in 1999
Video games with alternate endings